Reliance was built in France in 1790 and was registered in 1804 at Bristol. She left Bristol on a voyage as a slave ship but her crew scuttled her in June before having embarked any slaves. 

Captain James Gordon acquired a letter of marque on 16 March 1804. He sailed from Bristol on 30 April (or 4 May), bound from Gambia to the West Indies.

On 28 December Lloyd's List (LL) reported that Reliance, Gordon, master, had been lost in the Gambia River.

In December 1807 Captain Gordon sued Reliances insurers for lost commission and privileges due to her loss when he scuttled her by fire. Reliance had arrived on the African coast in mid-June 1804. On 24 June a French privateer of superior force appeared. When it became clear that Reliance could neither fight nor escape, Gordon and his men fired her guns into her hold to hole her and then set fire to her to prevent the enemy from capturing her. He and his men then escaped ashore in her long boat. The court found for the plaintiff, Gordon, as the insurance policy expressly covered loss by fire.

Citations and references
Citations

References
 
 

1790 ships
Ships built in France
Captured ships
Age of Sail merchant ships of England
Bristol slave ships
Maritime incidents in 1804
Ship fires
Scuttled vessels
Shipwrecks of Africa